The Embassy of Singapore, Washington, D.C. is Singapore's main diplomatic mission to the United States. It is located at 3501 International Place Northwest, Washington, D.C.

The embassy also operates Consulates-General in San Francisco, New York City, and Honorary Consulates-General in Miami and Chicago.

The incumbent ambassador is Ashok Kumar Mirpuri.

See also
 Singapore–United States relations
 Singapore Ambassador to the United States

References

External links

Official site

Singapore
Washington, D.C.
Singapore–United States relations
North Cleveland Park